The BBÖ 113 was a class of 40 express train, 4-8-0 tender locomotives operated by the Federal Railway of Austria (Bundesbahnen Österreichs, BBÖ).

History

After World War I new locomotives had to be built for the Austrian Western Railway due to increasing train loads and the replacement of old, wooden, passenger coaches with steel-bodied coaches. Between 1923 and 1928 40 locomotives of this new Class 113 were taken into service with the BBÖ.

This class was very powerful and much liked by locomotive crews. It was employed on the most importance passenger train duties and in front of express and fast trains (Eilzüge) and fulfilled its role on main lines well until the end of the steam era, when its top speed of 85 km/h was no longer considered enough. In 1939, the Deutsche Reichsbahn took these locomotives over as DRG Class 33 101–140. In 1953 there were still 33 engines left in the ÖBB, their Reichsbahn numbers being retained. All were retired by 1968.

Class 113 was further developed in Hungary, where 514 MÁV Class 424 were built for Hungary, Yugoslavia and North Korea.

Preserved locomotives
Number 33.102 has been preserved for the Austrian Railway Museum (Österreichische Eisenbahnmuseum) and is based today at the Strasshof Railway Museum (Eisenbahnmuseum Strasshof) in Lower Austria. In the 1980s a preserved example in Yugoslavia was bought by private firm and restored to operational status. Today this engine has the fictitious number 33.132 and is available for heritage trips. A single Os24 locomotive exists in Poland, which can be regarded more as a Polish copy of the Class 570 predecessor.

See also 
 Deutsche Reichsbahn 
 List of DRG locomotives and railbuses

References

External links 
 The Class 33 at dampflok.at
The locomotive database

4-8-0 locomotives
131
Railway locomotives introduced in 1923
Standard gauge locomotives of Austria
Lokomotivfabrik der StEG locomotives
Floridsdorf locomotives
Passenger locomotives